The Würth 400 is a  NASCAR Cup Series stock car race held annually at Dover Motor Speedway in Dover, Delaware in the spring.

History

The 2020 race was postponed to August due to the COVID-19 pandemic and became a doubleheader with the second race. Both events were named the Drydene 311 as their race lengths were shortened. For 2021, the race length was restored to 400 miles.

Alex Bowman won the race in 2021 as part of a historic 1-2-3-4 finish for Hendrick Motorsports.

In September 2021, RelaDyne bought the Drydene brand which was the title sponsor of the race. The company added another one of their brands, DuraMAX, to the title sponsor of the race. RelaDyne was also included in the name of the race as a presenting sponsor. As a result, in 2022, the name of the race became the DuraMAX Drydene 400 presented by RelaDyne. In 2023, Würth, which has been a sponsor on Team Penske's NASCAR Cup and Xfinity Series cars for a few races each year since 2012, became the title sponsor of the "Monster Mile" race.

Past winners

Notes
1974: Race shortened due to energy crisis.
2007 and 2019: Races postponed from Sunday to Monday due to rain.
2015 and 2017: Races extended due to NASCAR overtime.
2020: Race postponed from May 3 and ran as a twin-race event with regularly scheduled fall race on August 23 due to COVID-19 pandemic.
2022 Race started on Sunday afternoon but finished on Monday afternoon due to rain.

Multiple winners (drivers)

Multiple winners (teams)

Manufacturer wins

Notable moments

2014: Coming off turn two, A. J. Allmendinger came across Ricky Stenhouse Jr. and got loose. He collected Greg Biffle and both got loose. Biffle went into the wall tail-first, hit Stenhouse, and sent him into the outside wall and headfirst into the inside one on the backstretch. Landon Cassill and Ryan Truex also spun out in Turn 1. This brought out the third caution of the race. The race was then red-flagged, while Justin Allgaier also took damage when he was clipped in the side by Biffle. Kevin Harvick took the lead from Johnson on lap 142 while on lap 157, Jamie McMurray hit a piece on concrete in Turn 2, hit the wall in Turn 3, and brought out the fourth caution. This happened in a similar fashion to Jeff Gordon at Martinsville Speedway in 2004. NASCAR was forced to red flag the race for a second time to fix a hole in the track, while the concrete also damaged the glass covering the crossover bridge that crosses over the top of Turn 2. The race was suspended for 22 minutes, with Harvick holding the lead at the restart. However, just after the restart, Harvick had a tire go down and Matt Kenseth took the lead, Johnson retook the lead on lap 179, and upon completing lap 215, he became the all-time leader in laps led at Dover. Bowman hit the wall for a third time in turn 1 and brought out the fifth caution on lap 218. J. J. Yeley brought out the sixth caution on lap 240 after blowing his engine, while debris brought out the seventh caution with forty laps to go. Casey Mears' right-rear tire came apart and the inner-liner rubber that came off the tire brought out the eighth caution with eight laps to go. Johnson held off a four-lap charge by Brad Keselowski to take his second win of the season – successively, for the 13th time in his career – and 68th of his career. "It is incredible," Johnson said. "This race car was awesome. I just have so much to be thankful for. Chad (crew chief Knaus) told me I'd love the car, and sure enough, from the time we unloaded the car, he was right." Keselowski described his day as "up and down" and that his car did not progress as much as he had liked until the halfway mark of the race.
2015: For the first few laps, Truex Jr. kept Hamlin from getting a big lead, but as the field caught the tail end of the field, Hamlin jumped to a bigger lead. Eventually, Truex Jr. took back the lead on lap 145. The second round of pit stops began on lap 150 when Clint Bowyer hit pit road. Truex Jr. surrendered the lead to pit on lap 158 and gave it to Hamlin. He pitted on lap 160 and handed the lead to teammate Carl Edwards. He pitted on lap 162 and handed the lead to Dale Earnhardt Jr. The second caution flew on lap 163 when Ricky Stenhouse Jr. had a tire blow out and slammed the wall in turn 2. David Gilliland was tagged for speeding on pit road during the green flag stops and was forced to serve a drive-through penalty. Edwards was tagged for taking equipment out of the pit box after the wrench used to adjust the track bar got stuck in the hole and restarted the race from the tail end of the field. The race restarted on lap 169 with Truex Jr. in the lead. The third caution of the race flew on lap 176 for a 3-car wreck on the front stretch. This began when Trevor Bayne while exiting turn 4, was moving up the track and got turned by Michael Annett. He overcorrected, turned down, and hit the inside wall. Annett continued to ride the wall before getting rear-ended by Allgaier. Annett continued on, but Allgaier did not. While Truex opted not to pit, most of the cars on the lead lap behind him did. The race restarted with two laps to go at a scheduled green-white-checkered finish, Johnson shot ahead of teammate Kasey Kahne and held off Harvick to score his tenth career win at Dover. He became the fifth driver to have 10 or more wins at a single track.
2016: The race at Dover moved up two weeks before the All-Star Race at Charlotte, A major multi-car wreck occurred after their restart just past the start/finish line brought out the 11th caution of the race. Johnson's car stalled out, fell backward, and caused an 18-car wreck. Johnson, Truex, Harvick, McMurray, Newman, A. J. Allmendinger, Ricky Stenhouse Jr., Kyle Busch, Joey Logano, Aric Almirola, Hamlin, Biffle, Casey Mears, Dale Earnhardt Jr., Clint Bowyer, Trevor Bayne, Paul Menard, and Michael McDowell were all collected in the wreck. Johnson said afterward that as soon as he "went from second and tried to go into third, I kind of got up into the neutral gate of the transmission and it didn't even want to go to third," Johnson said. "It stopped before it ever went to third. And then I tried fourth and third and eventually, I got hit from behind...I thought maybe I missed a shift, but it wouldn't go into gear. Martin was good and patient with me. He gave me a couple of opportunities to try to find gear but it just locked out and wouldn't go into gear for some reason." The subsequent cleanup forced the red flag to fly. The red flag was lifted after 11 minutes and 22 seconds, The race restarted with 35 laps to go. Despite a hard-fought battle towards the finish with Larson and Chase Elliott, Kenseth – who assumed the lead after the multi-car wreck with 46 laps to go – drove on to score the victory.
2021: For the first time since 1970, the track would only host one race instead of two. Alex Bowman bested his teammate Kyle Larson on pit road to win Dover's lone race of 2021. Bowman's victory capped off Hendrick Motorsports finishing 1-2-3-4. It is just the fourth time this was accomplished, and first since Roush-Fenway Racing did it at Homestead in 2005. While Bowman won and Larson was second, Chase Elliott finished 3rd, and William Byron finished 4th.

References

External links
 

1969 establishments in Delaware
AAA
 
NASCAR Cup Series races
Recurring sporting events established in 1969
Annual sporting events in the United States